All Included is an Arvingarna compilation album, originally supposed to be released on 18 April 2007 before the release was postponed one week, to 25 April 2007.

Track listing
Skenet bedrar
Sandras sång
Nån däruppe har koll på dej
Bara du vill
Leva lycklig
Du är allt jag drömt
Jeannie
Va hon inte vet
Himlen måste gråta (Heaven must cry)
Ring om du vill nånting
Tro mig
Min Amazon
Det borde vara jag
Kung i stan
Än finns det kärlek
En dag i taget
Bo Diddley
Det svär jag på
Till en öde ö
Det kan inget ändra på
I gult och blått
Eloise
Pamela
Natt efter natt
Sjunde himlen
Sommar och solvarma dar
En 68 (A Cabriolet)
Angelina
Coola killar
Twiilight
Månsken över Heden
Om dessa väggar kunde tala
Magdalena
De ensammas promenad
Superstar
Det regnar i mitt hjärta
Gud vad hon är läcker
Hela vägen hem
Du fick mig att öppna mina ögon
Räck mig din hand
Hon kommer med sommaren
Rakt in i hjärtat

Charts

References

2007 compilation albums
Arvingarna albums
Compilation albums by Swedish artists